The Armenian Patriarch of Constantinople, also known as Armenian Patriarch of Istanbul, is today head of the Armenian Patriarchate of Constantinople, one of the smallest Patriarchates of the Oriental Orthodox Churches but one that has exerted a very significant political role and today still exercises a spiritual authority. 

The Armenian Patriarchate of Constantinople recognizes the primacy of the Catholicos of All Armenians, in the spiritual and administrative headquarters of the Armenian Church, the Etchmiadzin, Armenia, in matters that pertain to the worldwide Armenian Apostolic Church. In local matters, the Patriarchal See is autonomous.

The seat of the Armenian Patriarchate of Constantinople is the Surp Asdvadzadzin Patriarchal Church (Holy Mother of God Patriarchal Church) in the Kumkapı neighborhood of Istanbul. 

The first Armenian Patriarch of Constantinople was Hovakim I, who was at the time the Metropolitan of Bursa. In 1461, he was brought to Constantinople by Sultan Mehmed II and established as the Armenian Patriarch of Constantinople. Hovakim I was recognized as the religious and secular leader of all Armenians in the Ottoman Empire, and carried the title of milletbaşı or ethnarch as well as patriarch. 

There have been 85 individual Patriarchs since the establishment of the Patriarchate:
75 patriarchs during the Ottoman period (1461-1908)
4 patriarchs in the Young Turks period (1908–1922)
6 patriarchs in the current secular Republic of Turkey (1923–present)

During the Ottoman Period (1461-1908), the Armenian Patriarchate served the Armenians in the Ottoman Empire with a line of Patriarchs in Constantinople. However, like the Greek Patriarchate, the Armenians suffered severely from intervention by the state in their internal affairs. Although there have been 115 pontificates since 1461, there have only been 84 individual Patriarchs.

In 1896 Patriarch Madteos III (Izmirlian) was deposed and exiled to Jerusalem by Sultan Abdülhamid II for boldly denouncing the 1896 massacre. The constitution governing the Armenians was suspended by the Sultan.

During the reign of the Young Turks (1908–1922), and after Sultan Abdulhamid II was deposed by the Young Turks, Patriarch Madteos III (Izmirlian) was permitted to return to Istanbul in 1908. 
The new Turkish administration also restored the constitution. In the initial period of the reign of the Young Turks, the Armenians enjoyed a brief period of restoration of civil liberties between 1908 and 1915. However starting in 1915, the Armenians suffered great hardship under the Young Turk administration and the Armenian community of Turkey was decimated by mass deportations of its Armenian population and the Armenian genocide. In this critical period, the post of the Patriarch remained vacant from 1915 to 1919 to be restored for a brief period from 1919 to 1922 with Patriarch Zaven I Der Yeghiayan residing. Four Armenian Patriarchs served under the rule of the Young Turks.  
 
After the establishment of the Republic of Turkey in 1923, and despite a huge diminution in the number of its faithful during the Armenian genocide, the patriarchate remains the spiritual head of the largest Christian community presently living in Turkey. Today, the Armenian Patriarchs are recognized as the head of the Armenian Apostolic Church in Turkey and he is invited to state ceremonies. Five Armenian Patriarchs have served after the establishment of the Republic of Turkey.

The last patriarch Mesrob II (Mutafyan) (Մեսրոպ Բ. Մութաֆեան) was retired by the synod on October 26, 2016, because of his illness which continued more than 7 years. A new patriarch was due to be elected. On 11 December 2019, Sahak II Mashalian was elected new patriarch.

See also
List of Armenian Patriarchs of Constantinople
Armenians in the Ottoman Empire
Armenian Apostolic Church
Armenians in Istanbul

Notes

References

External links

Armenian Patriarchate of Constantinople 
Gandzasar Monastery, Nagorno Karabakh

Christianity in the Ottoman Empire